The Passage is a 1986 film by the Iranian director Shahriar Bahrani. Bahrani also scripted the film which was lensed by Homayoun Payvar. Set during the Iran Iraq war, it is an example of Sacred Defence cinema.

Cast
 Khosrow Ziaei, Ataullah Soleimanian Muharram Zeinalzadeh Zadeh Ardalan Shoja Kaveh Mehrdad Khoshbakht Mojgan Bani Hashimi Ali Shah Hatami Mohammad Alidoost Maliheh Keshari Ansieh Ghanbari Ruhollah Baradari

References

1986 films
1980s Persian-language films
Iran–Iraq War films
1980s war films
Iranian war films